Idiobates is a monotypic genus of beetles in the family Tenebrionidae. Its only member is Idiobates castaneus.

References

Tenebrioninae
Tenebrionidae genera
Monotypic beetle genera